Change of Address may refer to:
 Change of address
 Change of Address (Krokus album), 1986
 Change of Address (The Shadows album), 1980
 "Change of Address", a promotional single by Blind Faith, 1969